La pulce d'acqua is an album of the Italian singer-songwriter Angelo Branduardi. It was released in 1977 by Polydor. A French edition, entitled La Demoiselle, was published in 1979; an English edition, entitled  Fables and Fantasies and with lyrics written by Peter Sinfield, was released in 1980.
 
The title track, "La pulce d'acqua" ("the water flea") is based on a Native American legend reported and adapted by Jaime de Angulo about a man falling ill because his shadow has been stolen by a water flea. "Ballo in Fa Diesis Minore" is based on Ingmar Bergman The Seventh Seal in which a man defies the personification of Death (lyrics are taken from an inscription of a Danse Macabre depiction at Clusone, near Bergamo); the melody is inspired by "Schiarazula Marazula", a medieval northern Italian theme which accompanied exorcism rites and which was collected by Giorgio Mainerio in his Primo libro de' balli (1578).  "Il ciliegio" ("The cherry tree") is based on the English traditional song "The Cherry Tree Carol". "Il poeta di corte", featuring launeddas parts by Luigi Lai, is partially based on "Canarios" by Aragonese Baroque composer Gaspar Sanz.

"La lepre nella luna" ("The hare in the Moon") is inspired by a Buddhist legend of the Moon rabbit. "La bella dama senza pietà" ("The beautiful merciless dame") recalls a John Keats' poem, in turn based on a composition by Alain Chartier. "La sposa rubata", finally, retakes a Breton song entitled "Ar plac'h dimezet gant Satan" ("The fiance of  Satana"), included in the Barzaz Breiz anthology.

Track listing
"Ballo in Fa diesis minore" – 7:02
"Il ciliegio" – 4:15
"Nascita di un lago" – 4:12
"Il poeta di corte" – 3:49
"Il marinaio" – 4:07
"La pulce d’acqua" – 4:44
"La sposa rubata" – 4:01
"La lepre nella luna" – 5:02
"La bella dama senza pietà" – 6:40"

1977 albums
Angelo Branduardi albums
Polydor Records albums